Maiestas heuksandoensis is a species of bugs from Cicadellidae family that is endemic to Korea. It was formerly placed within Recilia, but a 2009 revision moved it to Maiestas.

References

Insects described in 1979
Endemic fauna of Korea
Hemiptera of Asia
Maiestas